Bethany A. Hall-Long (born November 12, 1963) is an American politician and a member of the Democratic Party. She has served as the 26th lieutenant governor of Delaware since 2017. Hall-Long previously served in the Delaware Senate from 2008 to 2016 and in the Delaware House of Representatives from 2002 to 2008.

Early life and career
Hall-Long was born on November 12, 1963 in Sussex County. She is a descendant of David Hall, the 15th Governor of Delaware. She was raised on a farm with her two older brothers and attended Indian River High School. She earned a BSN from Thomas Jefferson University, an MSN from the Medical University of South Carolina, and a PhD in health policy and nursing administration from George Mason University.

Hall-Long began a teaching career at George Mason University before moving to the University of Delaware, where she is a professor of nursing.

Lieutenant Governor of Delaware 
Hall-Long was elected Lieutenant Governor of Delaware in 2016, taking office on January 17, 2017. She helped create a Behavioral Health Consortium in June 2017, which she now chairs. The consortium's role is to develop short-term and long-term plans to address addiction and mental health issues in Delaware. In 2018, Pew Charitable Trusts partnered with the Consortium to help increase access to opioid treatment. In June 2022 Hall-Long worked with state senator Sarah McBride and state representative Melissa Minor-Brown to secure $3.2 million in funding from the Delaware Department of Health and Social Services for the first in-patient addiction treatment facility for pregnant and parenting women in Delaware. She was reelected in 2020 over Republican Donyale Hall.

She served as Chair of the National Lieutenant Governor's Association from 2020 to 2021.

Electoral history 
In 2000, Hall-Long initially challenged incumbent Republican Representative Richard C. Cathcart for the District 9 seat, but lost in the general election.
In 2002, Hall-Long was redistricted to District 8 and won the general election with 3,591 votes (60.7%) against Republican nominee William Hutchinson.
In 2004, Hall-Long won the general election unopposed with 8,228 votes.
In 2006, Hall-Long won the general election with 5,864 votes (77.0%) against Republican nominee Edward Colaprete.
In 2008, Republican Senator Steven H. Amick retired and left the District 10 seat open. Hall-Long won the general election with 13,965 votes (64.9%) against Republican nominee James Weldin for the senate seat.
In 2012, Hall-Long won the general election unopposed with 16,498 votes.

Personal life
Hall-Long met her husband Dana while in high school and they married in 1987. Dana served in the U.S. Navy from 1982 to 1991 as a data systems technician. On October 30, 2014, he was arrested after being caught on video taking down political signs erected by Republicans.

See also 
List of female lieutenant governors in the United States

References

External links

Lt. Governor of Delaware official government website
Campaign website

|-

|-

1963 births
Living people
Lieutenant Governors of Delaware
Democratic Party Delaware state senators
Democratic Party members of the Delaware House of Representatives
Women state legislators in Delaware
21st-century American women politicians
21st-century American politicians
Thomas Jefferson University alumni
Medical University of South Carolina alumni
George Mason University alumni
People from New Castle County, Delaware
People from Sussex County, Delaware